The 2017 2. divisjon (referred to as PostNord-ligaen for sponsorship reasons) was a Norwegian football third-tier league. The league consisted of 28 teams divided into 2 groups of 14 teams.

The league was played as a double round-robin tournament, where all teams played 26 matches. The first round was played on 17 April 2017, while the last round was played on 21 October 2017.

League tables

Group 1

Group 2

Promotion play-offs 

The teams who finished in second place in their respective group qualified for the promotion play-offs, where they faced each other over two legs. The winner will play against the 14th placed team in 1. divisjon for a place in the 2018 1. divisjon.

3–3 on aggregate. Notodden won 5–4 on penalties.

Top scorers

Group 1

Group 2

References 

Norwegian Second Division seasons
3
Norway
Norway